The 2003 Oklahoma Sooners football team represented the University of Oklahoma in the 2003 NCAA Division I-A football season, the 109th season of Sooner football. The team was led by two-time Walter Camp Coach of the Year Award winner (winning his second one that season), Bob Stoops, in his fifth season as head coach. They played their home games at Gaylord Family Oklahoma Memorial Stadium in Norman, Oklahoma. They were a charter member of the Big 12 Conference.

Conference play began with a win over the Iowa State Cyclones in Ames, Iowa on October 4, and ended with an upset loss to the Kansas State Wildcats in the 2003 Big 12 Championship Game on December 6. The Sooners finished the regular season 12–1 (8–1 in Big 12) while winning the Big 12 South. Despite their loss in the conference championship game, they were invited to the 2004 Sugar Bowl, which served as the BCS National Championship Game that year, where they lost to the LSU Tigers, 14–21.

Following the season, Tommie Harris was selected 14th overall in the 2004 NFL Draft, along with Teddy Lehman in the 2nd round, and Derrick Strait in the 3rd.

Schedule

Roster

Game summaries

North Texas

Alabama

Fresno State

UCLA

    
    
    
    
    
    
    
    
    
    
    
    
    

Antonio Perkins became the first Division I-A player in history to have three returns for a score in one game while also breaking the NCAA single-game punt return yardage record.

Iowa State

Texas (Red River Shootout)

Missouri

Colorado

    
    
    
    
    
    
    
    
    

This was Oklahoma's first win in Boulder since 1988.

Oklahoma State (Bedlam Series)

Texas A&M

Baylor

Texas Tech

Kansas State (Big 12 Championship Game)

LSU (Sugar Bowl)

Statistics

Team

Scores by quarter

Rankings

2004 NFL Draft

The 2004 NFL Draft was held on April 24–25, 2004 at The Theater at Madison Square Garden in New York City. The following Oklahoma players were either selected or signed as undrafted free agents following the draft.

References

Oklahoma
Oklahoma Sooners football seasons
Oklahoma Sooners football